Lisec is a settlement in the Municipality of Trebnje in eastern Slovenia. It is a settlement of dispersed houses among the vineyards on the western slopes of Lisec Hill west of Dobrnič. The area is part of the historical region of Lower Carniola. The municipality is now included in the Southeast Slovenia Statistical Region.

A small open chapel-shrine in the northern part of the settlement dates to the second half of the 19th century.

References

External links
Lisec at Geopedia

Populated places in the Municipality of Trebnje